

Canada
The Connaught Cup may refer to a number of sporting competitions named after Prince Arthur, Duke of Connaught who served as Governor General of Canada from 1911 to 1916:

 Connaught Cup Stakes, a horse-racing competition
 Challenge Trophy, an association football competition formerly known as the Connaught Cup.

Ireland
The Connaught Cup may refer to a number of sporting competitions played in the Irish province of Connacht, also known as Connaught. 

 Connacht Junior Cup (association football) 
 Connacht Senior Cup (association football)
 Connacht Senior League Challenge Cup, an association football cup competition
 Connacht Gold Cup, the league cup of the Mayo Association Football League
 Connacht Senior Cup (rugby union)
 Connacht Schools Rugby Senior Cup, a rugby union competition
 Connacht Schools Junior Cup, a rugby union competition
 Connacht Railway Cup, former Gaelic football competition

See also
 Connacht Cup (disambiguation)
 Connacht Senior Cup (disambiguation)

Sports competitions in Canada
Sports competitions in Connacht